Saura is a village in the municipality of Nesna in Nordland county, Norway.  It is located on the southeastern side of the island of Handnesøya.  It is the location of Handnesøya Chapel, some small shops, and a dock.

References

Nesna
Villages in Nordland